The 2013–14 Liga Nacional de Ascenso de Honduras season was the 35th edition of the Honduran Liga Nacional de Ascenso, the second division of football in Honduras. Since last season, promotion was changed from a two-legged home-and-away match to a one-legged match in a neutral ground. The tournament began on 11 August 2013.

2013–14 teams

Teams from Zona Norte y Atlántica
Arsenal (Roatan)
CD Honduras (El Progreso)
Social Sol (Olanchito)
Sula (La Lima)
Trujillo FC (Trujillo)
Unión Sabá (Sabá)
Yoro FC (Yoro)

Teams from Zona Norte y Occidente
Atletico Choloma (Choloma)
Atletico Limeño (La Lima)
Atlético Nacional (Villanueva)
Atlético Municipal (San Francisco de Yojoa)
Graciano San Francisco (Gracias)
Lepaera San Isidro (Lepaera)
Olimpia Occidental (La Entrada)
Real Juventud (Santa Bárbara)
Villanueva FC (Villanueva)

Teams from Zona Central
Atlético Esperanzano (La Esperanza)
Atlético Independiente (Siguatepeque)
Cobán Athletic (Jesús de Otoro)
Comayagua FC (Comayagua)
Marcala FC (Marcala)
UPN (Tegucigalpa)

Teams from Zona Centro-Sur y Oriente
Alianza de Becerra (San Francisco de Becerra)
Atlético Olanchano (Catacamas)
Juticalpa F.C. (Juticalpa)
Leon Libertador (Choluteca)
Valencia (Tegucigalpa)
Valle FC (Nacaome)

Apertura

Regular season

Results

Clausura

Promotion Final

Relegation

Zona Norte

Zona Centro-Sur

References

2013–14 in Honduran football
Hon
Honduran Liga Nacional de Ascenso seasons